Critical or Critically may refer to:

Critical, or critical but stable, medical states
Critical, or intensive care medicine
Critical juncture, a discontinuous change studied in the social sciences.
Critical Software, a company specializing in mission and business critical information systems
Critical theory, a school of thought that critiques society and culture by applying knowledge from the social sciences and the humanities
Critically endangered, a risk status for wild species
Criticality (status), the condition of sustaining a nuclear chain reaction

Art, entertainment, and media
Critical (novel), a medical thriller written by Robin Cook
Critical (TV series), a Sky 1 TV series
"Critical" (Person of Interest), an episode of the American television drama series Person of Interest
"Critical", a 1999 single by Zion I

People
Cr1TiKaL (born 1994), an American YouTuber and Twitch streamer

See also
Critic
Criticality (disambiguation)
Critical Condition (disambiguation)
Criticism
Crisis
Critique